Venus in Furs is a 1969 Italian supernatural erotic thriller film directed by Jesús Franco and starring James Darren.

The film (also known as Paroxismus and Black Angel) bears only a superficial resemblance to the 1870 novel Venus in Furs by Leopold von Sacher-Masoch. The title and character names in Franco's original script were changed to the novel's for commercial reasons. Franco's film is a surreal supernatural erotic thriller about unattainable love and how far one is willing to go for the person they desire.  It is not a study in masochism as the novel is.

Premise
James Darren plays a jazz musician who becomes obsessed to the point of madness with the mysterious fur-clad Wanda, then finds her dead body washed up on the beach.

Cast
 James Darren as Jimmy Logan
 Barbara McNair as Rita
 Maria Rohm as Wanda Reed
 Klaus Kinski as Ahmed Kortobawi
 Dennis Price as Percival Kapp
 Margaret Lee as Olga
 Adolfo Lastretti as Insp. Kaplan (as Aldo Lastretti)
 Jesús Franco as jazz musician (uncredited)
 Manfred Mann as jazz musician (uncredited)
 Paul Muller as Hermann (uncredited)

Music
British avantgarde fusion band Manfred Mann Chapter Three wrote and recorded the soundtrack for Venus in Furs. The band had just formed at the time. Excerpts were released in 2019 as part of the album Radio Days, Vol. 3: Manfred Mann Chapter Three (Live Sessions & Studio Rarities). One of the tracks, entitled "At the Party" on the soundtrack, later ended up on Manfred Mann Chapter Three Volume Two as "Jump Before You Think".

Reception
The New York Times gave Venus in Furs a negative review on its initial release, saying that the film "features much inept fancy moviemaking (including echoes of "La Dolce Vita" and even "Vertigo"), some semi-nudity, and virtually endless confusion". Glenn Erickson was more positive.

See also
 Klaus Kinski filmography

References

External links

1969 films
1960s erotic thriller films
1960s English-language films
Italian erotic thriller films
German erotic thriller films
West German films
English-language German films
English-language Italian films
1960s Italian-language films
Films directed by Jesús Franco
Supernatural thriller films
Erotic fantasy films
Films set in Rio de Janeiro (city)
Films set in Turkey
Films about music and musicians
Films about interracial romance
Films scored by Stu Phillips
1960s Italian films
1960s German films